Alejandro "Alex" Cristian Moreno (born 21 April 1973) is a retired Italian-Argentine rugby union player. He played as a prop.

Career
Whilst at Leicester he helped them win the domestic double in 2007; playing in both the 2007 EDF Energy Cup Final and the 2007 Premiership Final. He last played for Leeds Carnegie in the Guinness Premiership, which he joined in 2009 from Rugby Calvisano. Moreno retired in 2010.

References

External links
Leeds profile
Leicester Tigers profile

1973 births
Living people
Rugby union players from Buenos Aires
Argentine rugby union players
Argentina international rugby union players
Italian rugby union players
Italy international rugby union players
Argentine sportspeople of Italian descent
Rugby union props
Leicester Tigers players